KADQ-FM (98.3 FM) is a radio station licensed to Evanston, Wyoming, United States. The station is currently owned by Frandsen Media Company, LLC and carries a classic rock format.  The station broadcasts from a tower on Medicine Butte, northeast of Evanston.

History
This station received its original construction permit from the Federal Communications Commission on April 1, 2005.  The new station was assigned the call letters KSNA by the FCC on March 28, 2006.  Just over a week later, on April 6, 2006, the station was assigned the current KADQ-FM callsign.  KADQ-FM received its license to cover from the FCC on April 3, 2008.

Silent
On April 30, 2008, the station informed the FCC that it had fallen silent on April 22, 2008, and citing financial reasons it requested special temporary authority to remain silent.  The FCC granted this request on September 10, 2008, with a scheduled expiration of March 9, 2009.  On February 26, 2009, KADQ-FM filed for an extension of their remain silent authority but this request was dismissed on January 7, 2010. The station resumed broadcasting briefly on March 30, 2009, but fell silent again on March 31, 2009. , the station's April 7, 2009, application for remain silent authority had been accepted for filing but was pending further action by the Commission.

References

External links

ADQ-FM
Uinta County, Wyoming
Classic rock radio stations in the United States
Radio stations established in 2005